Alicia Fuentes Molina (born 27 May 1978), commonly known as Ali, is a Spanish retired footballer who played mainly as a midfielder. She was at her peak between 1997 and 2003, when she won three Spanish leagues and four Spanish cups and she was a member of the Spain women's national football team, taking part in the 1997 European Championship.

Club career
Born in Totalán, Málaga, Fuentes' first team was Atlético Málaga, the main women's club in the province. With Atlético she won both the national championship and the national cup in 1998. In 2000, she signed for Levante UD, taking part in their golden age. In her three seasons there she won two leagues and three cups, and she played the first edition of the UEFA Women's Cup.

In 2003, she returned to Andalusia to play for Estudiantes Huelva. One year later she left Estudiantes for newly promoted Sevilla FC, which was the championship's runner-up in 2006. In 2007, she left Sevilla for Apolo Properties, a second-tier team with an ambitious project. However, it wasn't promoted and for the next season Fuentes returned to the top league in newly promoted FC Barcelona.

After two years in Barcelona, Fuentes returned to Atlético Málaga in 2010. When Málaga was relegated in 2012 she returned to Barcelona to play for another newly promoted team, Levante Las Planas.

International career
Fuentes started to play for the Spain in 1997, just in time to be called up for the 1997 European Championship, Spain's first appearance in a final tournament. She played three of Spain's four games, always entering in the second half. She remained in the national team for five more years, making her last appearances in the 2003 World Cup qualifiers, while she played for Levante UD.

In 2012–13 she was one of three remaining active players of the 1997 Euro squad, along with Levante UD's Maider Castillo and RCD Espanyol's Vanesa Gimbert.

References

External links
Profile at Txapeldunak.com 

1978 births
Living people
Spanish women's footballers
Spain women's international footballers
Primera División (women) players
Levante UD Femenino players
FC Barcelona Femení players
Málaga CF Femenino players
Sevilla FC (women) players
Footballers from Málaga
Women's association football utility players
Women's association football defenders
Women's association football midfielders
Women's association football forwards
FC Levante Las Planas players